Harry Simpson (born 1875) was an English footballer who played in the Football League for Crewe Alexandra and Stoke.

Career
Simpson was born in Stoke-upon-Trent and began his career with nearby Crewe Alexandra. He spent the 1895–96 at Crewe making 34 appearances which included eight in the FA Cup as the "Alex" reached the first round stage. He then joined First Division Stoke for the 1896–97 season being used as a reserve and left for New Brighton Tower after playing eight matches for Stoke.

Career statistics
Source:

References

English footballers
Crewe Alexandra F.C. players
Stoke City F.C. players
English Football League players
1875 births
Year of death missing
New Brighton Tower F.C. players
Association football midfielders